Waking Sleeping Beauty is a 2009 American documentary film directed by Disney film producer Don Hahn and produced by Hahn and former Disney executive Peter Schneider. The film documents the history of Walt Disney Feature Animation from 1984 to 1994, covering the rise of a period referred to as the Disney Renaissance.

The film uses no new on-camera interviews, instead relying primarily on archival interviews, press kit footage, in-progress and completed footage from the films being covered, and personal film/videos shot (often against company policy) by the employees of the animation studio.

Waking Sleeping Beauty debuted at the 2009 Telluride Film Festival, and played at film festivals across the country before its limited theatrical release on March 26, 2010 by Walt Disney Studios Motion Pictures.

Synopsis
The documentary is narrated by animator and film producer Don Hahn, with numerous audio interviews from company animators and executives.

The documentary begins in the early 1980s, when The Walt Disney Company was led by Walt Disney's son-in-law Ron W. Miller.  Many new animators had joined the company after graduating from CalArts, but were hired in a time where animation was considered a dying art.  Roy E. Disney, Walt's nephew and son of Disney co-founder Roy O. Disney, resigned from the company during a corporate takeover attempt by Saul Steinberg, which led to Miller's ousting. Roy returned to the company as vice-chairman of the board of directors, and chairman of the animation department. Roy installed Michael Eisner and Frank Wells, respectively, as the company's new CEO and President.

Eisner hired Jeffrey Katzenberg as head of the film division, but he proved to be a controversial figure, moving the animation department to an off-site location in Glendale, California. Roy hired Peter Schneider to be President of Walt Disney Feature Animation, who helped modernize the animation process. Losing at the box office to animated films released by Don Bluth, a former studio animator who left in 1979 to found his own company, Disney began producing new animated films to be released at a pace of one per year, and also began to release its classic films in the new home video videocassette formats. A gong show in the company led to the green-lighting of numerous film projects.  The production of Who Framed Roger Rabbit, though expensive for Disney, proved to be a huge financial success, along with Oliver & Company.

The Disney Renaissance, which lasted from 1989 to 1999, began with The Little Mermaid. The soundtrack was composed and written by Howard Ashman and Alan Menken, who also composed Beauty and the Beast; Menken later composed Aladdin.  Ashman's involvement in The Little Mermaid and Beauty and the Beast aided in both being box office successes and winning Academy Awards for Best Original Song and Best Original Score. However, Ashman died from AIDS in March 1991 before Beauty and the Beast was released; the film was dedicated to his memory. The Rescuers Down Under  utilized the new CAPS system, which blended traditional and computer animation together, but the film was a box office disappointment.

At the production crew's wrap party screening of Beauty and the Beast, Eisner announced that a new animation building would be built on the studio lot as a reward for their hard work, but Katzenberg was unaware of this.  In 1994, The Lion King was released and became another box office success for Disney. On April 4, 1994, Frank Wells died in a helicopter crash.  Following Wells' death, Katzenberg expected to become the new company president, but was denied the position by Eisner, eventually leading to his resignation; he later would go on to co-found future animation, film, TV, gaming, and music rival DreamWorks.

Cast

 Don Hahn : Himself - Narrator (voice)
 Michael Eisner : Himself (archive footage)
 Jeffrey Katzenberg : Himself (archive footage)
 Roy E. Disney : Himself  (archive footage)
 Frank Wells : Himself (archive footage)
 Peter Schneider : Himself (archive footage)
 John Musker : Himself (archive footage)
 Ron Clements : Himself (archive footage)
 John Lasseter : Himself (archive footage)
 Steven Spielberg : Himself (archive footage)
 Rob Minkoff : Himself (archive footage)
 Glen Keane : Himself (archive footage)
 Roger Allers : Himself (archive footage)
 Mike Gabriel : Himself (archive footage)
 Thomas Schumacher : Himself  (archive footage)
 Howard Ashman : Himself (archive footage)
 Robert Zemeckis : Himself  (archive footage)
 Joe Ranft : Himself (archive footage)
 Angela Lansbury : Herself (archive footage)
 Alan Menken : Himself (archive footage)
 Janis Roswick : Herself (archive footage)
 Nora Menken : Herself (archive footage)
 Anna Menken : Herself (archive footage)
 Gary Trousdale : Himself  (archive footage)
 Kirk Wise : Himself  (archive footage)
 Jodi Benson: Herself (archive footage)
 Jerry Orbach: Himself (archive footage)

Production
Narration is done by Hahn, with new audio-only interviews done by several of the studio's principal figures, including former executives Eisner, Katzenberg, and Roy E. Disney, and animator/directors Mike Gabriel, Rob Minkoff, Roger Allers, Gary Trousdale, and Kirk Wise. The footage includes filmmakers Tim Burton, John Lasseter, Don Bluth, Ron Clements, John Musker, Steven Spielberg, Robert Zemeckis, Richard Williams, and George Scribner, as well as Howard Ashman, Alan Menken, Jodi Benson, Robin Williams, Paige O'Hara, Jerry Orbach, Angela Lansbury, Jeremy Irons, Nathan Lane, Elton John, and Tim Rice. A significant portion of the personal film used was shot by John Lasseter and Joe Ranft for Disney animator Randy Cartwright, who is featured giving makeshift "studio tours" in 1980, 1984, and 1990. The Cartwright footage is used to bookend the film.

The film is dedicated to the memory of Howard Ashman, former Disney President and chief operating officer Frank Wells, animator Joe Ranft, and Roy E. Disney.

Reception 
Since its 2009 release, Waking Sleeping Beauty has received generally positive reviews from critics. Rotten Tomatoes gives the film a "certified fresh" rating of 71% based on 51 reviews. The site's general consensus is, "[The film] doesn't probe as deep – or tell as many hard truths – as it could have, but Don Hahn's look at Disney's rebirth offers a fascinating and surprisingly candorous glimpse into the studio's past." Metacritic, which assigns a normalized rating out of 100 top reviews from mainstream critics, calculated a score of 70 based on 18 critics.

It earned a Special Achievement Award at the 2010 Annie Awards and a Best Documentary Feature nomination at the 2010 St. Louis Gateway Film Critics Association Awards.

See also
 The Pixar Story, a 2007 documentary film chronicling the history of Pixar Animation Studios.
 Dream on Silly Dreamer, a 2005 documentary by Disney animators Dan Lund and Tony West on the rise and fall of traditional animation at Disney from 1980 through 2002.
 Howard, a 2018 documentary by Don Hahn about the life of songwriter Howard Ashman who helped create some of Disneys most iconic songs.

References

External links
 
 
 
 
 

2009 films
Collage film
Disney documentary films
2009 documentary films
Films about Disney
Films set in studio lots
Documentary films about animation
Documentary films about Hollywood, Los Angeles
Disney Renaissance
Films distributed by Disney
2000s American animated films
Films produced by Don Hahn
Films about filmmaking
Films directed by Don Hahn
2000s English-language films
Michael Eisner
Jeffrey Katzenberg